Theodore Wells Pietsch III (born March 6, 1945) is an American systematist and evolutionary biologist especially known for his studies of anglerfishes.  Pietsch has described 72 species and 14 genera of fishes and published numerous scientific papers focusing on the relationships, evolutionary history, and functional morphology of teleosts, particularly deep-sea taxa. For this body of work, Pietsch was awarded the Robert H. Gibbs Jr. Memorial Award in Systematic Ichthyology by the American Society of Ichthyologists and Herpetologists in 2005. Pietsch has spent most of his career at the University of Washington in Seattle as a professor mentoring graduate students, teaching ichthyology to undergraduates, and curating the ichthyology collections of the UW Burke Museum of Natural History and Culture.

His zoological author abbreviation is Pietsch.  See also :Category:Taxa named by Theodore Wells Pietsch III and a query for taxa he authored.

Education
Pietsch attended John Adams High School in Indiana. After a B.A. in zoology at the University of Michigan he did a M.S. and Ph.D. in biology at the University of Southern California. He was a postdoctoral fellow at Harvard University from 1973 to 1975. Pietsch taught at California State University at Long beach from 1975 to 1978 and the University of Washington from 1978 until his retirement in July 2015.

Academic research
Pietsch has named 72 species and 14 genera of fishes, most of them lophiiform taxa, both living and extinct, including the recently described Psychedelic Frogfish, Histiophryne psychedelica. He is recognized as an expert on the evolution, ecology, and behavior of both shallow-water anglerfishes (e.g., frogfishes) and deep-sea anglerfishes of the suborder Ceratioidei. Perhaps his most intriguing work has focused on the evolution of sexual parasitism in deep-sea anglerfishes, a reproductive strategy in which a tiny dwarf male attaches and fuses to a much larger female. With his studies of the evolutionary relationships of anglerfish species, Pietsch has determined that this reproductive mode may have evolved as many as five times within deep-sea anglerfishes.

In 2013, a newly described species of frogfish, Kuiterichthys pietschi, was named in his honor.

Published works

T. W. Pietsch is the author of over 245 scientific and popular articles, including 20 books, that focus primarily on marine ichthyology, especially the biosystematics, zoogeography, reproductive biology, and behavior of deep-sea fishes.  He has also published extensively on the history of science, especially the history of ichthyology.  Among the latter are works on the French comparative anatomist Georges Cuvier and his 22-volume Histoire Naturelle des Poissons (1828−1849); bookdealer, publisher, and secret agent Louis Renard and his Fishes, Crayfishes, and Crabs; the unpublished manuscripts of the French explorer-naturalist Charles Plumier; and the unpublished paintings of Indo-west Pacific marine fishes and crustaceans of Isaac Johannes Lamotius.  His first novel, The Curious Death of Peter Artedi: A Mystery in the History of Science, was published by Scott & Nix, New York, in December 2010. Trees of Life: A Visual History of Evolution, Johns Hopkins University Press, was published in 2012; annotated, illustrated, English translations of the first three volumes of Cuvier’s five-volume Histoire des Sciences Naturelles, depuis leur Origine jusqu’a nos Jours, Publications Scientifiques du Muséum and Bibliothèque Centrale, Muséum national d’Histoire naturelle, Paris, were published in 2012, 2015, and 2018, respectively; and Frogfishes: Biodiversity, Zoogeography, and Behavioral Ecology (with Rachel J. Arnold) and Cuvier’s Historical Portrait of the Progress of Ichthyology, from Its Origins to Our Own Time (second edition) in 2020. Hur dog Peter Artedi? [“How did Peter Artedi Die?”], translated from the English by Hans Aili, Ekström & Garay, Lund, Sweden; and Ichthyopedia: A Biographical Dictionary of Ichthyologists, American Philosophical Society, were published in 2023.

Selected bibliography
 1985. The manuscript materials for the Histoire Naturelle des Poissons, 1828−1849: Sources for understanding the fishes described by Cuvier and Valenciennes. Arch. Nat. Hist., 12(1): 59−108.
 1987. Frogfishes of the World: Systematics, Zoogeography, and Behavioral Ecology. Stanford University Press, Stanford, California, xxii + 420 pp. (with David B. Grobecker).
 1995. Historical Portrait of the Progress of Ichthyology, from Its Origins to Our Own Time. Edited and annotated by T. W. Pietsch, translated from the French by A. J. Simpson.  Johns Hopkins University Press, Baltimore, xxiv + 366 pp., 67 figures.
 1995. Fishes, Crayfishes, and Crabs: Louis Renard and His Natural History of the Rarest Curiosities of the Seas of the Indies. Johns Hopkins University Press, Baltimore, Vol. 1, Commentary, xxii + 214 pp., 95 figures; Vol. 2, Facsimile, 224 pp., 100 color pls.
 1997. Collection Building in Ichthyology and Herpetology. Amer. Soc. Ichthy. Herp., Spec. Publ., 3, xiii + 593 pp. (with W. D. Anderson, Jr.).
 2006. Les Planches inédites de Poissons et autres Animaux marins de l’Indo-Ouest Pacifique d’Isaac Johannes Lamotius [Isaac Johannes Lamotius (1646−c. 1718) and His Paintings of Indo-Pacific Fishes and Other Marine Animals]. Christian Érard (editor), Publications Scientifiques du Muséum and Bibliothèque Centrale, Muséum National d’Histoire Naturelle, Paris, 292 pp., 93 color pls. (with L. B. Holthuis).
 2008.  A Mermaid in the Tub: A Specimen of MvB Sirenne, a New Family of Type-Faces by Alan Greene, Inspired by Engraved Letterforms in a Rare Book. Mark van Bronkhorst and E. M. Ginger, editors, MvB Fonts, Albany, California, 36 pp.
 2009.  Oceanic Anglerfishes: Extraordinary Diversity in the Deep-sea. University of California Press, Berkeley and Los Angeles, xii + 557 pp.
 2010. The Curious Death of Peter Artedi:  A Mystery in the History of Science. Scott & Nix, New York, x + 224 pp.
 2012. Trees of Life: A Visual History of Evolution. Johns Hopkins University Press, Baltimore, xi + 358 pp. 
 2012. Cuvier’s History of the Natural Sciences:  Twenty-four Lessons from Antiquity to the Renaissance [the first of Georges Cuvier's five-volume Histoire des Sciences Naturelles, depuis leur Origine jusqu'a nos Jours, originally published in French from 1841 to 1845]. Edited and annotated by T. W. Pietsch, translated from the French by A. J. Simpson. Publications Scientifiques du Muséum and Bibliothèque Centrale, Muséum national d’Histoire naturelle, Paris, 734 pp.
 2015. Cuvier’s History of the Natural Sciences: Nineteen Lessons from the Sixteenth and Seventeenth Centuries [the second of Georges Cuvier's five-volume Histoire des Sciences Naturelles, depuis leur Origine jusqu'a nos Jours, originally published in French from 1841 to 1845]. Edited and annotated by T. W. Pietsch, translated from the French by B. D. Marx. Publications Scientifiques du Muséum and Bibliothèque Centrale, Muséum national d’Histoire naturelle, Paris, 859 pp.
 2017. Charles Plumier (1646–1704) and His Drawings of French and Caribbean Fishes, Publications Scientifiques du Muséum and Bibliothèque Centrale, Muséum national d’Histoire naturelle, Paris, 408 pp., 121 pls.
 2018. Cuvier’s History of the Natural Sciences: Twenty Lessons from the First Half of the Eighteenth Century [the third of Georges Cuvier’s five-volume Histoire des Sciences Naturelles, depuis leur Origine jusqu’a nos Jours, originally published in French from 1841 to 1845]. Edited and annotated by T. W. Pietsch, translated from the French by Fanja Andriamialisoa. Publications Scientifiques du Muséum and Bibliothèque Centrale, Muséum national d’Histoire naturelle, Paris, 576 pp.
 2019. Fishes of the Salish Sea: Puget Sound and the Straits of Georgia and Juan de Fuca, illustrated by Joseph R. Tomelleri. University of Washington Press, Seattle, 3 vols., 1,048 pp., 155 pls. (with James W. Orr).
 2020. Frogfishes: Biodiversity, Zoogeography, and Behavioral Ecology. Johns Hopkins University Press, Baltimore, Maryland, 601 pp., 346 figs. (with Rachel J. Arnold).
 2020. Georges Cuvier’s Historical Portrait of the Progress of Ichthyology, from Its Origins to Our Own Time. Second edition, revised and enlarged, edited and annotated by T. W. Pietsch, translated from the French by A. J. Simpson. Publications Scientifiques du Muséum, Muséum national d’Histoire naturelle, Paris, 672 pp., 149 figs.
 2023. Hur dog Peter Artedi? En vetenskapshistorisk gåta [“How did Peter Artedi Die? A Scientific Historical Riddle”]. Translated from the English by Hans Aili. Ekström & Garay, Lund, Sweden, 266 pp., 19 figs.
 2023. Ichthyopedia: A Biographical Dictionary of Ichthyologists. American Philosophical Society, Lightning Rod Press, Volume 10, xiv + 303 pp., 255 figs.

References

External links
 Faculty Profile at University of Washington
 Faculty Profile at UW Burke Museum of Natural History and Culture

American ichthyologists
Living people
1945 births
University of Washington faculty
University of Michigan College of Literature, Science, and the Arts alumni
University of Southern California alumni